Beverly McClellan (July 6, 1969 – October 30, 2018) was an American singer and a contestant in the first season of the American TV series The Voice, reaching the final four.

At age four, McClellan started playing the piano and later learned to play guitar, trumpet, French horn, mandolin, ukulele, bass guitar, djembe and a wide variety of drums and percussion. She started singing at age 24 and had been performing at clubs in and bars around Fort Lauderdale, Florida for 20 years. She had won the New York National Music Festival in 2004 as Best Overall Performer amongst 500 contestants.

Biography
She was born in Kingsport, Tennessee, and raised in Gate City, Virginia. McClellan studied at South Fork High School and then at Indian River Community College in Fort Pierce, Florida. Her paternal grandmother was a Native American of Mohawk descent. To honor her, McClellan had tattoos representing a variety of different aspects of her grandmother's heritage.

She first played with Tami Gordon in a duo called Uncommon Ground. After that she worked with singer, songwriter, guitarist Robyn Fear in the Florida Keys and south Florida region. Years later, she formed her own band called DJ's Daughter, named after her mother. She recorded a few songs with that band, played many gigs for years before beginning to perform as a solo act. She then recorded another two albums on her own before joining Swoop, another band from Fort Lauderdale, Florida. While she was in the recording studio, her producer invited her to try out for the first season of The Voice. Prior to auditioning for the show, McClellan had already recorded five independent albums without having been signed by any record label. She was coached by Christina Aguilera and finished in 3rd/4th place in the competition.

Performances on The Voice 

McClellan was an openly lesbian artist. In June 2011, she appeared on the cover of SHE magazine, a South Florida lesbian magazine. She also recorded lead vocals for the song "John the Revelator" on Steve Vai's 2012 album The Story of Light, and toured with Vai the same year.

Illness & death
Beverly McClellan was diagnosed with stage 3c endometrial cancer in March 2018 and performed her final show on the 24th. She died on October 30, 2018 in Fort Lauderdale, Florida.

Discography

Albums

(All independent releases on own label)
Uncommon Ground
Back to My Roots
As a Girl
Talk of the Town (2003)
Beverly McClellan (2011)
Fear Nothing (2011)

Singles

References

External links
Beverly McClellan official website

1969 births
2018 deaths
American lesbian musicians
21st-century American singers
LGBT people from Tennessee
American LGBT singers
American rock musicians
The Voice (franchise) contestants
People from Kingsport, Tennessee
Singers from Florida
Singers from Tennessee
Deaths from uterine cancer
Deaths from cancer in California
21st-century American women singers
20th-century LGBT people
21st-century LGBT people